The 1971 Purdue Boilermakers football team represented Purdue University during the 1971 Big Ten Conference football season. Led by second-year head coach Bob DeMoss, the Boilermakers compiled an overall record of 3–7 with a mark of 3–5 in conference play, placing in a three-way tie for sixth in the Big Ten. Purdue played home games at Ross–Ade Stadium in West Lafayette, Indiana.

Schedule

Roster

Game summaries

Washington
 Otis Armstrong 19 rushes, 121 yards

Minnesota
 Gary Danielson 15/20 passing, 300 yards

Northwestern
 Otis Armstrong 30 rushes, 179 yards

Wisconsin
 Otis Armstrong 35 rushes, 155 yards

References

Purdue
Purdue Boilermakers football seasons
Purdue Boilermakers football